Alexandr Malsh, also known by his username Kolento, is a Ukrainian Hearthstone player who streams on Twitch. He is widely regarded as among the top Hearthstone players. Malsh is currently signed with Cloud9. Kolento formerly played World of Tanks competitively, before turning to Hearthstone.. Now he plays civilization 6.

References

External links
 
 Kolento Twitch channel
 Kolento Youtube channel

Hearthstone players
Ukrainian YouTubers
Team Liquid players
Ukrainian esports players
Place of birth missing (living people)
Living people
Twitch (service) streamers
Year of birth missing (living people)